17 is the debut extended play (EP) by American R&B singer-songwriter Zhavia Ward. It was released on June 14, 2019, by record labels Columbia Records and Sony Music. 17 follows Ward's appearance on Fox reality television series The Four: Battle for Stardom, where she placed as one of the four finalists. In May 2019, Ward was featured on the soundtrack album Aladdin (2019), performing a version of the song "A Whole New World" with English musician Zayn.

Track listing

Notes
  signifies a co-producer
  signifies a vocal producer
 "Deep Down" contains a sample of "I'd Rather Go Blind", written by Bill Foster, Ellington Jordan and Etta James, and performed by James

References

External links
 

2019 debut EPs
Columbia Records EPs
Sony Music EPs
Albums produced by Hit-Boy
Albums produced by Supa Dups
Albums produced by Oak Felder